Fluhmann is a surname. Notable people with the surname include:

Myriam Flühmann (born 1986), Swiss figure skater
Urs Flühmann, Swiss orienteer